Saint Regis (or St. Regis) may refer to:

People
John Francis Regis, recognized as a saint by the Roman Catholic Church

Hotels
 St. Regis Hotels & Resorts
 St. Regis New York the original from which the brand is named

Places

Canada
Saint Regis, Quebec, the Canadian side of the St. Regis Mohawk Reservation, also called Akwesasne
Saint-Régis River (Roussillon), a tributary of the south shore of the St. Lawrence River in Quebec

United States
St. Regis Park, Kentucky, part of Louisville Metro
St. Regis, Montana, a census-designated place
St. Regis Falls, New York, a census-designated place in the town of Waverly
St. Regis Mohawk Reservation, New York, along the Canada–US border
St. Regis, New York, a hamlet within the reservation
Saint Regis Mountain, New York
St. Regis River in New York
Saint Regis Canoe Area
Lower St. Regis Lake
Upper St. Regis Lake
Saint Regis Pond
St. Regis River (Montana)

Other uses
St. Regis Indians, former lacrosse team from New York
Saint Regis University, a defunct diploma mill
Dodge St. Regis, an automobile (1979–81)
St. Regis Corporation, a major forest products company, merged with Champion International Paper in 1984
 , an American military landing craft

See also
Regis (disambiguation)